USS Balch (Destroyer No. 50/DD-50) was an  built for the United States Navy prior to the American entry into World War I. The ship was the first U.S. Navy vessel named in honor of George Beale Balch, a US Navy officer who served in the Mexican–American War and the American Civil War, and as Superintendent of the United States Naval Academy.

Balch was laid down by William Cramp & Sons of Philadelphia in May 1912 and launched in December. She was armed with four  guns and had eight 18 inch (450 mm) torpedo tubes.

After her March 1914 commissioning, she participated in a Presidential Fleet Review at New York City in May. After a period in reserve, Balch served on Neutrality Patrol duty. She picked up passengers and crew from a British ocean liner before the U-boat sank it. After the United States entered World War I in April 1917, Balch was sent overseas to patrol the Irish Sea out of Queenstown, Ireland. Balch made several unsuccessful attacks on U-boats. In October 1918, US destroyer  collided with Balch, sending her into Queenstown for two weeks of repairs.

Upon returning to the United States after the war in January 1919, Balch was placed in reduced commission. After alternating periods of activity and time in reserve, Balch was decommissioned at Philadelphia in June 1922. In November 1933 she dropped her name, becoming known only as DD-50. She was struck from the Naval Vessel Register in March 1935 and ordered scrapped in April.

Design and construction
Construction of the vessel—like her three sister ships—was awarded to William Cramp & Sons of Philadelphia which laid down her keel on 7 May 1912. On 21 December, Balch was launched by sponsor Miss Grace Balch, daughter of the ship's namesake, George Beale Balch. The ship was the first U.S. Navy ship named for Balch, a US Navy officer who served in the Mexican–American War and the American Civil War and, as a rear admiral, served as Superintendent of United States Naval Academy from 1879 to 1881.

Balch had two steam turbines that drove her two screw propellers, and an additional pair triple-expansion steam engines, each connected to one of the propeller shafts, for cruising purposes.

Balch was also equipped with four twin  torpedo tubes.

Pre-World War I
Balch was commissioned into the United States Navy on 26 March 1914 under the command of Lieutenant Commander David C. Hanrahan. Balch served briefly with the Torpedo Flotilla, Atlantic Fleet, carrying out torpedo firing practice off the Virginia Capes before participating in a Presidential Fleet Review for President Woodrow Wilson at New York City on 7 May. Following fleet maneuvers with the Submarine Flotilla out of New London, Connecticut, the Torpedo Flotilla joined the battleship squadrons in Narragansett Bay for maneuvers organized by the Naval War College. Returning to the New York Navy Yard that summer, Balch was placed in reserve commission on 24 July 1914.

The destroyer was placed in full commission again on 17 December 1914 and rejoined the Atlantic Fleet. In June 1915, one of Balchs ,  torpedoes was unloaded at the Brooklyn Navy Yard, loaded on a horse-drawn truck, and hauled across the Brooklyn Bridge to the Astor Hotel in Manhattan. There, the weapon was on display – along with a shell from a  naval gun—for two days at the "Peace and Preparation" conference of the National Security League. A year later, Balch served as the US Navy's observation platform during the inter-club cruise after the Seawanhaka-Corinthian Yacht Club's annual June regatta. Balch was sent to examine which of the powerboats entered into the cruise—reported by The New York Times as about half of the 200 entries—might be suitable for use as naval auxiliaries.

Prior to the entrance of the United States into World War I, she served on Neutrality Patrol duty, trying to protect American and neutral-flagged merchant ships from interference by British or German warships and U-boats. In the course of performing those duties, Balch was at Newport, Rhode Island, in early October 1916. At 0530 on 8 October, wireless reports came in of a German submarine stopping ships near the Lightship Nantucket, off the eastern end of Long Island. After an SOS from the British steamer  was received at about 1230, Rear Admiral Albert Gleaves ordered Balch and other destroyers at Newport to attend to survivors. The American destroyers arrived on the scene about 1700 when the U-boat,  under the command of Kapitänleutnant Hans Rose, was in the process of stopping the Holland-America Line cargo ship . Shortly after, U-53 stopped the British passenger ship . As Rose had done with three other ships U-53 had sunk earlier in the day, he gave passengers and crew aboard Blommersdijk and Stephano adequate time to abandon the ships before sinking the pair. At one point, Rose signaled Balch requesting that she move out of the way to allow Stephano to be torpedoed, much to the later chagrin of Lord Beresford, who denounced Balchs compliance as "aiding and abetting" the Germans in a speech in the House of Lords. In total, 226 survivors from U-53s five victims were rescued by the destroyer flotilla. Balch picked up the crew of Stephano and a number of passengers, later transferring them to destroyer  for return to Newport.

World War I
When the United States entered World War I on 6 April 1917, Balch fitted out—installing depth charge racks and other wartime gear—in preparation for foreign service. Sailing for European waters on 25 October, Balch arrived at Queenstown, Ireland on 17 November and reported for duty with the Queenstown Force Commander. The destroyer began convoy escort duties on 24 November, which generally meant shepherding merchant ships through the "submarine danger zone" in the western approaches to the United Kingdom and France.

While this duty was relatively uneventful, Balch did twice encounter German submarines. On 29 January 1918, while steaming off Liverpool, she dropped two depth charges over a diving U-boat, without effect. Then, on 12 May, the destroyer joined other escorts in depth-charging a U-boat spotted near convoy HS 60, with Balch dropping 12 depth charges that helped drive off the submarine.

There were other perils at sea, however, most notably on 20 October 1918 when  collided with Balch during convoy escort operations. The collision knocked Balchs port depth charge overboard, but Boatswain's Mate Second Class Albert Cerveny, Coxswain Frank Sekowski, and Gunner's Mate Second Class Frank H. Sumner—all of whom received letters of commendation from the US Navy—recognized that a collision was imminent and set the depth charges to "safe". Balch did suffer steering gear damage which required two weeks of repair at Queenstown. Then, on 5 November, while escorting a convoy in the English Channel, the Balch helped American destroyer  rescue 29 survivors of the foundering merchant ship Dipton, returning the survivors to Queenstown.

Inter-war period
Following the signing of the Armistice on 11 November which ended all fighting, Balch received orders to sail for home and she departed Ireland on 16 November. She arrived at Norfolk, Virginia, via Ponta Delgada, Azores, on 1 January 1919 and was placed in ordinary. Returned to commission in early April, the destroyer sailed to the West Indies for three weeks of maneuvers out of Guantánamo Bay, Cuba. Balch then returned to Norfolk on 28 April for an overhaul. In July 1920, she was assigned the hull code of DD-50 under the US Navy's alphanumeric classification system. Postwar funding shortages kept the destroyer in port until late 1921, when Balch briefly cruised with the Torpedo Flotilla, Atlantic Fleet, before financial considerations led to her inactivation.

Balch was decommissioned at Philadelphia on 20 June 1922. On 1 November 1933, she dropped the name Balch to free it for a new destroyer of the same name, becoming known only as DD-50. The ship was struck from the Naval Vessel Register on 8 March 1935, and, on 23 April, was ordered scrapped at the Philadelphia Navy Yard.

References

Notes

Bibliography

External links
 

Aylwin-class destroyers
Ships built by William Cramp & Sons
1912 ships
World War I destroyers of the United States